The Crescent Connection Bridge Run is a 4-mile race held in New Orleans, Louisiana, United States. The race is held in June on the Crescent City Connection bridge over the Mississippi River.

References

External links 
Official site

Road running competitions in the United States
Road Running
June events